Nóra Ní Shíndile, Irish singer (see Keening), fl. 1800.

Ní Shíndile was a native of Millstreet, County Cork and a professional keener in the late 1790s/early 1800s. About 1800, the scribe and poet, Éamonn de Bhál, transcribed Caoineadh Airt Uí Laoghaire from her rendering, thus preserving the full version of the caoineadh for posterity.

See also

 Caitilin Dubh

External links
 http://www.peadaroriada.ie/index.php?option=com_content&view=article&id=81&Itemid=97

Irish women singers
18th-century Irish people
19th-century Irish people
Musicians from County Cork
Irish-language singers
Year of birth missing
Year of death missing